Tracey Mosley (born 25 September 1973 in Sydney, Australia) is a softball player from Australia, who won a silver medal at the 2004 Summer Olympics and a bronze medal at the 2008 Summer Olympics.

External links

 Australian Olympic Committee profile

1973 births
Australian softball players
Living people
Olympic softball players of Australia
Softball players at the 2008 Summer Olympics
Softball players at the 2004 Summer Olympics
Olympic silver medalists for Australia
Olympic bronze medalists for Australia
Sportswomen from New South Wales
Olympic medalists in softball
Medalists at the 2008 Summer Olympics
Medalists at the 2004 Summer Olympics
Sportspeople from Sydney